The 1982 European Judo Championships were the 31st edition of the European Judo Championships, and were held in Rostock, East Germany on 14–16 May 1982.

Medal overview

Men

Medal table

Results overview

Men

Under 60 kg

Under 65 kg

Under 71 kg

Under 78 kg

Under 86 kg

Under 95 kg

Over 95 kg

Open class

References 
 Results of the 1982 European Judo Championships (JudoInside.com)

E
European Judo Championships
1982 in East German sport
International sports competitions hosted by East Germany
Judo competitions in Germany
Sport in Rostock
1980s in Mecklenburg-Western Pomerania